Dave Stryker (born March 30, 1957) is an American jazz guitarist. He has recorded over twenty-five albums as a leader and has been a featured sideman with Stanley Turrentine, Jack McDuff, and Kevin Mahogany.

Career
Stryker grew up in Omaha, Nebraska. When he was ten years old, he was inspired by the Beatles to start playing guitar. His interest was rock and roll until he heard the albums My Favorite Things by John Coltrane and Beyond the Blue Horizon by George Benson. By seventeen, he was a jazz guitarist in Omaha. In 1978 he moved to Los Angeles where he took lessons from another Omaha native, Billy Rogers, and met organist Jack McDuff. After moving to New York City, he toured with McDuff in 1984-5, then spent ten years with saxophonist Stanley Turrentine.

Stryker formed a band with Steve Slagle and a trio with Jared Gold and Tony Reedus (later McClenty Hunter and Billy Hart). He worked with Kevin Mahogany as sideman, composer, and arranger, appeared with him at Carnegie Hall, and toured with him in Europe and Japan. He has also worked with Eliane Elias, Javon Jackson, and Andy LaVerne.

He teaches jazz guitar at Indiana University and Montclair State University and at the Jamey Aebersold Summer Jazz Workshop, the Litchfield Jazz Camp, and the Veneto/New School Workshop in Italy.

In 2018 Stryker began teaching jazz guitar online through the ArtistWorks music education website.

Awards and honors
 Top Ten Guitarists, Down Beat magazine Readers' Poll, 2001
 Rising Star, Down Beat magazine Critics' Poll

Discography

As leader

 First Strike (Someday of Mugen Music, 1988)
 Strike Zone (SteepleChase, 1990) 
 Guitar on Top (Ken Music, 1991) 
 Passage (SteepleChase, 1991) 
 Blue Degrees (SteepleChase, 1992) 
 Full Moon (SteepleChase, 1993) 
 Stardust (SteepleChase, 1994) 
 Nomad (SteepleChase, 1994) with Bill Warfield Big Band
 The Greeting (SteepleChase, 1995) 
 Blue to the Bone (SteepleChase, 1996) 
 Big Room (SteepleChase, 1996) 
 All the Way (SteepleChase, 1997) 
 Blue to the Bone II (1998) 
 Shades of Miles (SteepleChase, 1998) 
 Changing Times (SteepleChase, 1999) 
 Blue to the Bone III (SteepleChase, 2001) 
 Exit 13 (Etoile, 2002) with Sylvia Cuenca, Kyle Koehler
 Shades Beyond (SteepleChase, 2004) 
 Big City (Mel Bay, 2004)
 Six String Santa (Strikezone, 2005) 
 The Chaser (Mel Bay, 2006) 
 Strike Up the Band (SteepleChase, 2008) 
 One for Reedus (SteepleChase, 2010) 
 Keystone (SteepleChase, 2010) 
 Blue Strike (SteepleChase, 2011) 
 Blue to the Bone IV (SteepleChase, 2012)  
 Suit Up! (Bounce-Step, 2013) with Matt Kane, Kyle Koehler
 Eight Track (Strikezone, 2014) 
 Messin' with Mister T (Strikezone, 2015) 
 Eight Track II (Strikezone, 2016) 
 Strikin' Ahead (Strikezone, 2017)
 Eight Track III (Strikezone, 2019)
 Eight Track Christmas (Strikezone, 2019)
 Blue Soul (Strikezone, 2020) with Bob Mintzer & The WDR Big Band
 Baker's Circle (Strikezone, 2021) with Walter Smith III
 As We Are (Strikezone, 2022)
 Prime (Strikezone, 2023) 

With Stryker/Slagle Band
 The Stryker/Slagle Band (Khaeon, 2003)
 Live at the Jazz Standard (Zoho, 2005)
 Latest Outlook (Zoho, 2007)
 The Scene (Zoho, 2008)
 Keeper (Panorama, 2010)
 Routes (Strikezone, 2016)

With Trio Mundo
 Carnaval (Khaeon, 2002)
 Trio Mundo Rides Again (Zoho, 2004)

As sideman
With Jared Gold
 Out of Line (Posi-Tone, 2010)
 Intuition (Posi-Tone, 2012)
 JG3+3 (Posi-Tone, 2014)
 Metropolitan Rhythm (Posi-Tone, 2015)
 Reemergence (Strikezone, 2018)

With Steve Slagle
 Smoke Signals (Panorama, 1991)
 Our Sound! (Double-Time, 1995)
 Steve Slagle Plays Monk (SteepleChase, 1998)
 New New York (OmniTone, 2000)
 Evensong (Panorama, 2013)
 Dedication (Panorama, 2018)

With others
 Allan Botschinsky, Last Summer (MA Music, 1992)
 Allan Botschinsky, I've Got Another Rhythm (MA Music, 1995)
 Don Braden, Luminosity (Creative Perspective Music, 2015)
 Kendall "Keyz" Carter, Introducing Kendall Carter (Lladnek Music, 2021)
 Rondi Charleston, Resilience (Resilience Music Alliance, 2017)
 Royce Campbell, Six by Six (Paddle Wheel/King [jp], 1994)
 Mike Freeman & Spellbound, Street Shuffle (Best Recordings, 1991)
 Giacomo Gates, Miles Tones: Giacomo Gates Sings the Music of Miles Davis (Savant, 2013)
 Craig Handy, Reflections in Change (Sirocco Music, 1999)
 Javon Jackson, Pleasant Valley (Blue Note, 1999)
 Matthew Kaminski, Swingin' On the New Hammond (Chicken Coup, 2013)
 Andy LaVerne, Stan Getz in Chappaqua (SteepleChase, 1997)
 Pete Levin, Jump! (Pete Levin Music, 2010)
 Kevin Mahogany, Another Time Another Place (Warner Bros., 1997)
 Kevin Mahogany, Pride & Joy (Telarc, 2002)
 Jorge Nila, The Way I Feel (Strikezone, 2003)
 Jorge Nila, Tenor Time (Ninjazz, 2018)
 Tony Reedus, Minor Thang (Criss Cross, 1996)
 Larry Schneider, Ali Girl (SteepleChase, 1997)
 Stanley Turrentine, T Time (MusicMasters, 1995)
 Charenee Wade, Offering (Membran, 2015)
 Matthew Whitaker, Now Hear This (Resilience Music Alliance, 2019)

References

External links
 Official site

1957 births
Living people
American jazz guitarists
Jazz fusion guitarists
SteepleChase Records artists
20th-century American guitarists